
The Potamogeton natans community (NVC community A9) is one of the aquatic communities in the British National Vegetation Classification system.

It is a comparatively widely distributed community. There are three subcommunities.

Community composition

One constant species is found in this community, Broad-leaved Pondweed (Potamogeton natans).

No rare species are associated with the community.

Distribution

This community is found widely throughout Britain.

Subcommunities

There are three subcommunities:
 the so-called Species-poor subcommunity
 the Elodea canadensis subcommunity
 the Juncus bulbosus - Myriophyllum alterniflorum subcommunity

References

 Rodwell, J. S. (1995) British Plant Communities Volume 4 - Aquatic communities, swamps and tall-herb fens  (hardback),  (paperback)

A09